The New Order is the second studio album by American thrash metal band Testament, released on May 5, 1988.

Overview
Alex Skolnick recounts of the album recording process:

The New Order was the album that broke Testament into the thrash metal mainstream, back by its only single "Trial by Fire" which featured a music video, as did the cover of Aerosmith's "Nobody's Fault". This success would only grow with their next album Practice What You Preach. The New Order was also the first Testament album to enter the Billboard 200, reaching number 136 on that chart. It was also the band's first album to include an instrumental track. The album contains many songs that the band still plays live to this day including "Into the Pit", "The Preacher", "The New Order", "Disciples of the Watch", and "Trial by Fire". "Into the Pit", "The New Order", and "Disciples of the Watch" are among Testament's most frequently performed songs; all three of which have been played live over 600 times with the former of the three being their most played song live.

One of Testament's earliest songs dating back to their period as Legacy, "Reign of Terror", was reportedly recorded during the sessions of The New Order, but was left off the album. This re-recorded version of "Reign of Terror" can be found as a b-side to the "Trial by Fire" single as well as the band's 1993 EP Return to the Apocalyptic City. The song would be re-recorded again in 2001 for the album First Strike Still Deadly.

Reception and legacy

Reviews for The New Order have generally been favorable. Allmusic's Alex Henderson awards the album four-and-a-half stars out of five, and claims that Testament "delivered its best offering ever" and describes it as "every bit as brutally forceful as The Legacy." He also called the album the "ideal choice." Adam McCann of Metal Digest wrote: "Even though there had less than a year between The Legacy and The New Order, Testament already showed significant progress as songwriters as they crafted excellent thrash metal that got the listeners to get up off their arse and get into the pit. This was the sound of Chuck Billy, Alex Skolnick and co. firing on all cylinders as they battered their way out of the Bay Area and into the thrash metal mainstream."

The New Order entered the Billboard 200 album charts about three months after its release. The album peaked at number 136 and remained on the chart for thirteen weeks, making it Testament's longest run so far. "Trial by Fire" and "The Preacher" were released as singles, but neither of them charted.

By 1990, The New Order had sold over 250,000 copies in the U.S.

Accolades
In 2007, Revolver called it one of their 20 essential eighties thrash albums.
In 2014, Revolver also placed The New Order on its "14 Thrash Albums You Need to Own" list.
In 2016, Loudwire ranked the album as Testament's second best.
In 2017, Loudwire also listed the album as the 18th best thrash metal album of all time.
In 2018, Decibel inducted the album into their hall of fame.
The same year, Loudwire placed it among the best metal albums of 1988.

Touring and promotion
Testament toured for three months to promote The New Order. They toured Europe shortly after its release alongside thrash acts Megadeth, Sanctuary, Flotsam and Jetsam and Nuclear Assault. This was followed by a summer U.S. tour, which featured support from Vio-Lence, Forbidden, Voivod, Sanctuary, Destruction, Overkill, Nuclear Assault, Carnivore, Death Angel, Atheist and Potential Threat. They toured Europe again in August, replacing Megadeth on the Monsters of Rock tour. After playing two shows in San Francisco in December 1988, and one show with Heathen at the Country Club in Reseda in January 1989, Testament began work on their third studio album Practice What You Preach.

Track listing

Cover versions
 The track "Into the Pit" was covered by The Absence on their 2007 album, Riders of the Plague.
 The track "The Preacher" was covered by Hell's Thrash Horsemen on their 2009 EP, ...Till Violence.

Personnel
Testament
Chuck Billy – vocals
Alex Skolnick – lead guitar
Eric Peterson – rhythm guitar, cover art concept
Greg Christian – bass
Louie Clemente – drums

Production
Tom Coyne – mastering
Robert Hunter – assistant engineer
Alex Perialas – producer, engineer, mixing
Jon Zazula – executive producer
Marsha Zazula – executive producer
Andy Meyn – photography
William Benson – artwork

Charts

References

Testament (band) albums
1988 albums
Atlantic Records albums
Albums produced by Alex Perialas
Megaforce Records albums